Cooley LLP is an American international law firm, headquartered in Palo Alto, California, with offices worldwide. The firm's practice areas include corporate, litigation, intellectual property, fund formation, public markets, employment, life sciences, clean technology, real estate, financial services, retail, regulatory and energy.

Cooley is particularly known for its technology and life sciences practices as well as its experience with marquee initial public offerings (IPOs) and deep-rooted venture capital connections & financing. It has consistently been ranked as an elite law firm for technology and life sciences companies, startups and emerging growth companies, and venture capital firms by Above the Law, and U.S. News & World Report. Cooley represents as clients over a third of the companies on The Wall Street Journal'''s Billion Dollar Startup Club.

According to Law360, Cooley is "widely regarded as one of Silicon Valley's go-to law firms". It is one of the fifty largest law firms in the world.

History
Cooley was founded by Arthur Cooley and Louis Crowley in 1920 in San Francisco. In 1958, Cooley formed Draper, Gaither and Anderson, the first venture capital partnership organized on the West Coast. In the 1950s, Cooley formed Raychem and National Semiconductor. In 1971 the firm (then Cooley, Crowley, Gaither, Godward, Castro & Huddleson) began representing Disney in the copyright and trademark infringement case Walt Disney Productions v. Air Pirates. In the early 1980s, the firm took both Genentech and Amgen public. In the late 1980s, the firm relocated its offices from San Francisco to Palo Alto. In 1989, the firm (then Cooley, Godward, Castro, Huddleson & Tatum) facilitated the IPO of Qualcomm. On October 31, 2006, the firm (then Cooley Godward) merged with Kronish Lieb Weiner & Hellman, which resulted in the firm growing from 440 lawyers to 550. In the announcement of the merger, The New York Times referred to Cooley as a "Leading Silicon Valley law firm". In 1995, two former partners of the firm, Robert Gunderson and Scott Dettmer, formed the law firm of Gunderson Dettmer. Like many other law firms,  the firm laid off 114 people in 2009 from its offices, citing "the uncertain economy".

Offices

Cooley has offices in ten U.S. cities, London, Shanghai, Beijing, Brussels, and Singapore.

Cooley launched in London in January 2015, creating a 55-lawyer practice and the firm's first office in Europe. Its lawyers were hired from the London offices of Morrison & Foerster and Edwards Wildman Palmer, raiding the latter's entire office.  The office is run by Justin Stock who headed the corporate department of Morrison & Foerster's London office before joining Cooley.

The firm launched its Beijing office in 2018.

RecognitionThe American Lawyer has ranked Cooley number forty-seven in its annual ranking of U.S. law firms by gross revenue. Top Legal 500 and the National Law Journals NLJ 250 has ranked Cooley's practice areas from second through eighth tier in its national survey of law firms. In addition, U.S. News & World Report nominated Cooley as the 2011–12 law firm of the year in biotechnology law. In 2011, Cooley LLP was named U.S. Tax Court Firm of the Year by the International Tax Review. Cooley was recognized as one of Law360's Capital Markets Practice Groups of the year for 2015, and 2019. In 2016, Chambers UK recognized Cooley as being a leading practice in six practice areas along with singling out sixteen lawyers for their performance. In 2018, Cooley was named by U.S. News & World Report as the #1 law firm in the country in both the venture capital law and technology law categories, and the firm was named by The American Lawyer's Recorder publication as the top Venture Capital practice of the year.

Cooley has been recognized as one of only five law firms (and the highest ranking of any law firm) to be listed on Fortunes 100 Best Companies to Work For. The firm's first-year associates are paid a salary of US $215,000.2018 Crain's New York recognized Cooley on its 100 Best Places to Work in New York City list as the #4 best large company and the #1 law firm.
 Fortune recognized Cooley on its Best Workplaces in New York list, designating the firm in the top 10 of all large companies in the state.2019'''
 Law360 Names Cooley 2018 Capital Markets Practice Group of the Year

See also
List of largest United States-based law firms by profits per partner

References 

Law firms based in Palo Alto, California
Law firms established in 1920
1920 establishments in California